41st National Board of Review Awards
January 1, 1970
The 41st National Board of Review Awards were announced on January 1, 1970.

Top Ten Films 
They Shoot Horses, Don't They?
Ring of Bright Water
Topaz
Goodbye, Mr. Chips
Battle of Britain
Isadora
The Prime of Miss Jean Brodie
Support Your Local Sheriff!
True Grit
Midnight Cowboy

Top Foreign Films 
Shame
Stolen Kisses
The Damned
La Femme Infidèle
Ådalen 31

Winners 
Best Film: They Shoot Horses, Don't They?
Best Foreign Film: Shame
Best Actor: Peter O'Toole (Goodbye, Mr. Chips)
Best Actress: Geraldine Page (Trilogy)
Best Supporting Actor: Philippe Noiret (Topaz)
Best Supporting Actress: Pamela Franklin (The Prime of Miss Jean Brodie)
Best Director: Alfred Hitchcock (Topaz)

External links 
 National Board of Review of Motion Pictures :: Awards for 1969

1969
National Board of Review Awards
National Board of Review Awards
National Board of Review Awards
National Board of Review Awards